Hanbei may refer to:
Yoshida Hanbei, Japanese illustrator in the ukiyo-e style
Takenaka Shigeharu, Japanese samurai also known as Hanbei